Banoo Main Teri Dulhann (English: I will become your Bride) (international title: The Vow) is an Indian soap opera that aired on Zee TV from 14 August 2006 to 28 May 2009. It starred Divyanka Tripathi and Sharad Malhotra in the lead roles of Vidya and Sagar. The series deals with the life of a small city woman, Vidya, who reaches Delhi after marrying Sagar, a rich businessman.

Season 1

The story is about a beautiful, simple and loyal Vidya from Benaras(Varanasi). She does all the work in her household and her uncle, aunt, and cousin Shalu torture her. They don't allow Vidya to get an education, leaving her illiterate. Soon, Rajendra Pratap Singh who was a landlord in Banaras who lives in Delhi and is a businessman comes to Benaras to find a wife for his son Sagar. When Sagar's father sees Vidya, he decides that she will be his daughter-in-law. On the day of her marriage day, Vidya finds out that Sagar is mentally unstable with the mind of a child due to a car accident that happened six months ago that almost claimed his life. Sagar does not realize he is married so he and Vidya get off to a rocky start. Sindoora, Sagar's evil step-sister wants the Thakur's property. She caused the deadly car accident to kill Sagar but was unsuccessful. Chandra and Mahua are Sindoora's younger sisters and do whatever Sindoora tells them to and continually harass Vidya. Sindoora attempts to put much blame on Vidya to expel her from the house. But, her generous ex-husband Aniket and son Bharat are supportive toward Vidya. Aniket and Bharat both want to see Sagar and Vidya together. Despite these problems, she completes all of her duties and endears herself to the family, even Sagar. Sagar's younger cousin Cheenu and Shalu marry. Vidya's ex-lover and a goon from Banaras Harsh comes to Delhi and marries Chandra. Mahua, who is divorced from her husband, marries Rajeev Shokla. Vidya learns that the doctor from Singapore can cure Sagar, so she and Sagar both go there. Sindoora finds out and then plans multiple attacks on Sagar and Vidya but Sagar's operation went successfully. He becomes mentally normal, but he doesn't remember anything before his car accident and so doesn't remember Vidya. Sindoora then takes advantage of this and tries to turn Sagar's against Vidya, but Sagar learns that he and Vidya are married and later they remarry. Sindoora blames Harsh for the attacks on Sagar and Vidya in Singapore. Sindoora tries again to kill Sagar but Aniket becomes paralyzed while trying to protect Sagar. Gayatri, Sagar's paternal aunt arrives and knows that Sindoora is trying to kill Sagar. So she teams up with Vidya to get rid of Sindoora. With Gayatri's encouragement Vidya learns to read and write. They try their best to expose Sindoora but Sagar doesn't listen to their arguments. Vidya then pretends to be pregnant for Sagar under Gayatri's orders but fails to hide the truth from him. Sindoora plots and manages to send her ex-husband Aniket to jail by blaming him for Sagar's accident. Sindoora then plots and pays a man to run over Gayatri. She doesn't die but becomes comatose. She again plans an attack on Sagar in Benares which makes him not just mentally normal, but also remember multiple occasions when Sindoora had tried to kill him. He plots with Vidya and Chinu to get proof against her pretending to be mentally unstable but Sindoora identifies his plans and attacks the couple again. Later, Sindoora corners Sagar and Vidya on the edge of the cliff of Kailashpati Shankar Mandir (Lord Shiva) and she kills both of them by shooting them with her gun twice in a row. Bharat learns that Sindoora killed Sagar and Vidya and flees the house.

Season 2

21 years later
Sagar and Vidya were reborn as Amar Shivdhar Upadhyaya and Divya on the night of their death. Amar is born as Rajeev and Mahua's son. Rajiv overhears the priest's future prediction about Sindoora and swaps Amar with Shivhdhar Upadhayay's biological son Samrat. Divya is a modern rich girl from London and Amar is a spontaneous tour guide from Benaras. Divya is Samrat's friend and comes to meet him and his Singh family in Delhi. She mistakenly goes to Banaras instead of Agra. Amar and Divya both meet there, Divya has strange flashbacks of her previous birth time which she does not remember immediately. Amar and Divya fall in love with each other but Divya sacrifices her love for Amar for his childhood friend Bindiya and returns to Delhi. On the day of Amar and Bindiya's marriage Bindiya tells Amar about Divya's sacrifice and they both call off their marriage. Samrat proposes Divya for marriage and Divya agrees to it. Divya thinks that Amar is married to Bindiya. Samrat is marrying Divya only for money. Amar comes to Delhi to find Divya and meets the Singh family and he learns of Samrat and Divya's marriage and is heartbroken. Rajiv learns that Amar is his biological son and so does Sindoora. Divya finds Amar's letter and learns that Amar has not married Bindiya. Amar learns that Chinu and Shalu's daughter Kamna is pregnant with Samrat's child and they stop Samrat and Divya's marriage and reveal Samrat's truth to the family. Sindoora reveals to everyone about Amar being Rajiv's biological son and Rajiv also reveals the truth and show ends.

Cast and characters

Main
 Divyanka Tripathi Dahiya as Vidya Sagar Pratap Singh / Divya Amar Shukla  – Sagar/Amar's wife, Kaushalya's daughter.
 Sharad Malhotra as Sagar Pratap Singh / Amar Shivdhar Upadhay / Amar Rajeev Shukla AKA Chhota Thakur  – Vidya/Divya's husband, son of Rajendra Pratap Singh and Uma Pratap Singh (season 1) / Rajeev and Mahua's son (season 2).

Recurring
 Rajendra Gupta as Rajendra Pratap Singh – Sagar, Sindoora, Mahua and Chandra's father. Uma's husband, died of heart attack. (episodes 1–13)
 Surinder Kaur as Uma Pratap Singh – Sagar's mother. Rajendra Pratap Singh's 2nd wife. Sindoora, Mahua and Chandra's step-mother (Choti-Ma). (episodes 1–700)
 Jaya Bhattacharya as Gayatri – Sagar's aunt, Due to a car accident plotted by Sindoora, she goes into coma just like Divya (Vidya). (episodes 266–354)
 Kamya Panjabi as Sindoora Pratap Singh. Rajendra's eldest evil daughter, Bharat's ex-mother, Aniket's ex-wife, the murderer of Sagar and Vidya. She hates Vidya, Divya, Sagar and Amar. (episodes 7–557, 622–700)
 Rajesh Balwani as Aniket – Sindoora's ex-husband and Bharat's father. He knows Sindoora is evil and wants to see Sagar and Vidya together. (episodes 28-419, 515–700)
 Shyam Sharma as young Bharat – Aniket and Sindoora's son. He ran away from home and returned after 21 years.(episode 28-393)
 Raj Lathia as Sameer (episodes 100–343)
 Mohit Malik as adult Bharat Singh aka Mr. B.S. (episodes 515–700)
 Shamin Mannan as Aditi, Bharat's wife, and Karan's ex-wife. (episodes 516–700)
 Himanshi Choudhry / Ritu Vashist Vashisht as Mahua Singh – Rajiv's wife and Amar's mother. She eventually vanishes along with her sister Chandra. The character appeared in episodes 7-494 and 495–578.
 Amrapali Gupta as Radha, Vidya's friend from Benares. (episodes 1–12)
 Harsh Vashisht as Rajeev Shukla, Mahua's husband. He is later married to Chandra. The character appeared in episodes 278–514, 527,529, 553,571 & 575.
 Faisal Raza Khan as Kartik, Mahua's ex-husband.
 Vishal Watwani as Samrat, the false son of Rajeev and Mahua, biological son of Amar's parents. He is Viren and Divya's good friend, and is Divya's ex-fiancé. (episodes 396 through 507) 
 Addite Shirwaikar / Shweta Dadhich as Chandra, Rajendra's daughter. She eventually vanishes along with her sister Mahua. The character last appeared in episodes 7-393 and 396–673.
 Puneet Vashisht as Harsh, Chandra's ex-husband, in jail now. The character appeared in episodes 1–377.
 Kamini Kaushal as Dadi Maa, Harsh's grandmother.
 Suhita Thatte as Kaushalya, Vidya's mother (episodes 1–206), she does not know that her daughter Vidya and son-in-law Sagar were killed by Sindoora
 Renuka Bondre as Hema Chachi, Shalu's mother. She later vanishes with husband Harish. The character last appeared in episode 562.
 Snehal Sahai as Shalu, Chinu's wife. Hema's daughter, Kamna's mother and Vidya's cousin. The character last appeared in episodes 393,453, 517 & 537.
 Manish Naggdev as Cheenu, Shalu's husband, Kamna's father and Sagar's cousin. The character last appeared in episodes 393,453 & 537.
 Amrin Chakkiwala as Kamna, daughter of Chinu and Shalu. She is pregnant with Samrat's child. They were engaged, but broke up because Samrat kidnapped her held hostage. (episodes 403 to 508)
 Indraneil Sengupta as Tushar, Sagar's childhood friend. (episodes 128 through 206)
 Neeta Shetty as Dr. Shivani
 Soni Singh as Surili, Sagar's ex-girlfriend.
 Atul Srivastava as DJ, Sagar and Vidya's helper
 Abhileen Pandey as Chintu, Amar's younger cousin. He is really Samrat's brother. He vanishes.
 Anokhi Shrivastav as Bindiya, Amar's childhood friend and former fiancée.
 Aadesh Chaudhary as Viren, Divya and Samrat's old friend, and Divya's fake husband. (episodes 509 to 520)
 Sachin Shroff as Dr. Shashank. (episodes 677 to 696)
 Anisha Kapur as Gauri, a village girl who thinks Amar is her fiancée Shivam. (episodes 563 to 655)
 Omar Vani as Shivam, Gauri's fiancée in which Amar accidentally runs over him and dies. (episodes 562,563,566 & 593)
 Sonali Verma as Karuna, Bharat's Chhoti-Ma. She loved and cared for Bharat after he ran away from home because Sindoora killed Vidya and Sagar.

Special guests
From Saat Phere – Saloni Ka Safar:
Rajshree Thakur as Saloni Singh
Sharad Kelkar as Nahar Singh
From Maayka:
Neha Bamb as Mahi Sareen
Vivan Bhatena as Shabd Sareen
From Ghar Ki Lakshmi Betiyann:
Kshitee Jog as Saraswati Garodia
Romit Raj as Yuvraj Garodia
From Rakhi - Ek Atoot Rishte Ki Dor
Ayub Khan as Bhai Raja
Monalika Bhonsle as Neelima Thakur
Sayantani Ghosh as Amrita from Naaginn. (special appearance in episodes 581 and 582)

Production

Development
Producer Neelima Bajpai wanted to name the series as Dulhan but as the copyright was with Yash Raj Films with the same title of a film, Bajpai named the series as Banoo Main Teri Dulhann.

In November 2008, the shootings and telecast of all the Hindi television series including this series and films were stalled on 8 November 2008 due to dispute by the technician workers of FWICE (Federation of Western India Cine Employees). During the strike, the channels blacked out new episodes broadcast and repeat telecasts were shown from 10 November 2008. On 19 November 2008, the strike was called off after settling the disputes, and the production resumed. The new episodes started to telecast from 1 December 2008.

Cancellation 
The series was supposed to go off air on 22 May 2009 due to low ratings, but got an extension for four episodes and it ended on 28 May 2009.

International broadcasts

Response
The serial started at 14 August 2006, but it became a Superhit TV soap competing the other new Popular TV serials Woh Rehne Waali Mehlon Ki, Stree Teri Kahani, Kashmakash Zindagi Ki, Karam Apnaa Apnaa, and Ghar Ki Lakshmi Betiyann. Banoo Main Teri Dulhann was one of the Popular Television series of 2006 along with other Hit serials Woh Rehne Waali Mehlon Ki, Kashmakash Zindagi Ki, Stree Teri Kahani, Ghar Ki Lakshmi Betiyann.Sharad Malhotra was selected for Best Debut Actor for Indian Television Academy Awards 2007. Sharad Malhotra was also selected for Best Actor (Popular) for Indian Television Academy Awards 2008. Sharad Malhotra and Divyanka Tripathi both bagged Best Jodi in Indian Television Academy awards 2007. Divyanka Tripathi was selected for in Best Fresh Face award at Indian Telly awards for the year 2007. She also bagged Best popular Actress Indian Television Academy Awards for the year 2007. Kamya Punjabi bagged best Negative role award at Indian Telly Awards for the year 2007.

Reception
Rediff stated the performance of the series as slow and steady.

References

External links 
Banoo Main Teri Dulhann official site

Zee TV original programming
Indian television soap operas
2006 Indian television series debuts
2009 Indian television series endings
Television shows set in Delhi
Television shows set in Uttar Pradesh